Vampire Can Mating Oven is an EP by the alternative rock band Camper Van Beethoven, released in 1987. The EP includes satirical liner notes relating false stories behind the songs. A re-recorded version of "Never Go Back" was included the following year on the band's major label debut, Our Beloved Revolutionary Sweetheart.

Critical reception
Billboard called the EP "typically funny and provocative." Trouser Press deemed it "enjoyable odds and ends," and praised the "jolly" cover of "Photograph".

Track listing
"Heart" – 3:08
"Never Go Back" – 3:24
"Seven Languages" – 4:11
"Ice Cream Everyday" – 4:03
"Processional" – 3:48
"Photograph" – 3:14

Charts

References

External links
Album liner notes

Camper Van Beethoven albums
1987 EPs
Pitch-A-Tent albums